The 2022 Davis Cup World Group II was held on 16–18 September. The twelve winners from the World Group II will play at the World Group I Play-offs and the twelve losers will play at the World Group II Play-offs in 2023.

Teams
Twenty-four teams participated in the World Group II, in series decided on a home and away basis. The seedings are based on the Nations Ranking of 7 March 2022.

These twenty-four teams are:
 10 losing teams from World Group I Play-offs, in March 2022
 12 winning teams from World Group II Play-offs, in March 2022
 2 highest-ranked losing teams from World Group II Play-offs (China PR and Thailand)

The 12 winning teams from the World Group II will play at the World Group I Play-offs and the 12 losing teams will play at the World Group II Play-offs in 2023.

#: Nations Ranking as of 7 March 2022.

Seeded teams
  (#41)
  (#42)
  (#43)
  (#44)
  (#46)
  (#47)
  (#48)
  (#49)
  (#50)
  (#51)
  (#52)
  (#53)

Unseeded teams
  (#54)
  (#55)
  (#56)
  (#57)
  (#58)
  (#59)
  (#60)
  (#61)
  (#62)
  (#63)
  (#64)
  (#65)

Results summary

World Group II results

Uruguay vs. China

Lebanon vs. Monaco

Lithuania vs. Egypt

Thailand vs. Bolivia

Chinese Taipei vs. Hong Kong

Slovenia vs. Estonia

Tunisia vs. Greece

El Salvador vs. Denmark

Poland vs. Indonesia

Bulgaria vs. South Africa

Barbados vs. Ireland

Latvia vs. Dominican Republic

References

External links

World Group II
Davis Cup
Davis Cup
Davis Cup
Davis Cup
Davis Cup